Maria Silva may refer to:

 Maria Lucilene Silva, road cyclist from Brazil
 Maria Cavaco Silva (born 1938), First Lady of Portugal from 2006 until 2016
 Maria Paula Silva (born 1962), Brazilian basketball player
 Maria Silva Cruz (1915–1936), Spanish anarchist executed during the Casas Viejas incident
 María Silva (actress) (born 1941), Spanish film and television actress
 Maria José Silva, Nicaraguan racing cyclist
 María Fernanda Silva, Argentine diplomat
 María Eleonora Silva Silva, Peruvian politician

See also
 Maria Sílvia (1944–2009), Brazilian film, stage, and television actress